The Bannisdale Horseshoe is an upland area in Cumbria, England, near the eastern boundary of the Lake District National Park, surrounding the valley of Bannisdale Beck, a tributary of the River Mint. It is described in the final chapter of Wainwright's book The Outlying Fells of Lakeland. 

Wainwright describes Whiteside Pike as "a dark pyramid of heather and bracken and outcrops of rock: much the most attractive part of the horseshoe and worth a visit even if one goes no further."

References

Fells of the Lake District